Patrick Darryl Coleman is a former American football player who played wide receiver for five seasons in the NFL. He played for the New England Patriots and Houston Oilers.

References

1967 births
American football wide receivers
New England Patriots players
Houston Oilers players
Ole Miss Rebels football players
Living people
People from Cleveland, Mississippi